The Bravery Council of Australia Meeting 67 Honours List was announced by the Governor General of Australia, Major General Michael Jeffery,  on 20 August 2007.

Awards were announced for 
the Bravery Medal,
Commendation for Brave Conduct and
Group Bravery Citation.

Bravery Medal (BM)

Timothy Gordon Baigrie, Queensland
Russell Norman Crow, Victoria
Senior Constable Roland Curll, New South Wales Police Force
Miss Laura Megan Daley, Queensland
Inspector Paul James Devaney, New South Wales Police Force
Senior Constable Nicholas James Donald, Victoria Police
Senior Constable Michael James Folvig, Victoria Police
Detective Sergeant Andrew John Forster, New South Wales Police Force
Constable Adam Colin Hartley, Queensland Police
John Carlos Henry, New South Wales
James Michael O’Brien, Victoria
Keith Walter Sewell, New South Wales
Robert Arthur Smith, New South Wales
Detective Senior Constable David Paul Stuart, New South Wales Police Force

Commendation for Brave Conduct

Nicholas Aatkins, Victoria
Senior Constable Martin Graham Clifton, South Australia Police
Ms Helen Elizabeth Condie, New South Wales
Michael William Francis, New South Wales
Parinda Kraiwit
Constable Mathew Thomas McDougall, New South Wales Police Force
Constable Rob McMahon, New South Wales Police Force
Robert Allen Matulick, South Australia
Aaron James Scott, South Australia
Robert Angus Scott, New Zealand

Group Bravery Citation
Awardees comprise members of New South Wales Police Force and members of the public who in the early hours of the morning of 6 March 2003, assisted in attempting to rescue occupants from a burning car involved in a single vehicle accident at Beacon Hill, New South Wales.
Inspector Paul James Devaney, New South Wales Police Force
Roger Louis Ehret 
Sergeant Graeme Hallett, New South Wales Police Force
Senior Constable Todd Michael Halliday, New South Wales Police Force
Constable Brian Milos Laurich, New South Wales Police Force
Miss Marguerite Mary McKinnon 
Constable Michael Jeffrey Ridgeway 
Keith Walter Sewell 
Robert Arthur SMITH 
Constable Bradley David THOMPSON, New South Wales Police Force 
Detective Senior Constable Cara Walls, New South Wales Police Force

Awardees comprise members of the Volunteer Marine Rescue vessel, Rescue One, who on 22 April 2006 rescued sailors from an overturned fishing vessel at Thud Point, Queensland.
Peter John Graham 
Leslie George Mohoupt 
Steven George Rehn

References

Orders, decorations, and medals of Australia
2007 awards